Lucy Bellinger (born 6 November 1993) is an Australian rules footballer who played for Brisbane in the AFL Women's competition (AFLW).

Bellinger made her debut in the Lions' round 6 game against  at Hickey Park on 14 March 2020.

Bellinger was delisted ahead of the 2021 AFL Women's season.

References

External links
 

1993 births
Living people
Sportswomen from South Australia
Australian rules footballers from South Australia
Brisbane Lions (AFLW) players